Gustav Adolf Platz (November 21, 1881, Kraków - September 13, 1947, Mannheim) was a German architect.

He worked with Fritz Schumacher in Hamburg, then as an architect engineer for the City of Mannheim (starting in 1913).  He later served as manager of the architectural section (Stadtbaudirektor) of the City of Mannheim (1923-1932).

Literary works 
 Die Baukunst der neuesten Zeit, 1927

External links
 Gustav Adolf Platz at www.perlentaucher.de (German)
 

20th-century German architects
1881 births
1947 deaths
Architects from Kraków
Austro-Hungarian emigrants to Germany